Pinciná is a village and municipality in Lučenec District in the Banská Bystrica Region of southern central Slovakia.

History
In historical records the village was first mentioned in 1326.

Geography
The municipality lies at an altitude of 190 metres and covers an area of 11.917 km². It has a population of about 245 people.

External links
https://web.archive.org/web/20080111223415/http://www.statistics.sk/mosmis/eng/run.html 

Villages and municipalities in Lučenec District